The 1932 Buffalo Bulls football team was an American football team that represented the University at Buffalo as an independent during the 1932 college football season. In their first season under head coach James B. Wilson, the Bulls compiled a 1–5–1 record and were outscored by a total of 208 to 19. The team played its home games at Rotary Field in Buffalo, New York.

Schedule

References

Bufflao Bulls
Buffalo Bulls football seasons
Buffalo Bulls football